The following is a list of notable schools in Zambia.

All schools in Zambia whether public or private or community based are registered with the Ministry of General Education (MOGE). The Mandate of the Ministry of General Education (MoGE) is to formulate and implement Education and Science Policies, set and enforce standards and regulations, licence, supervise and provide education and skills development, as well as promote science, technology and innovation education.

Notable schools include:

Primary schools

 Sakeji School

Secondary schools

 Anoya Zulu Secondary School
 Banani International Secondary School
 Baobab College
 Canisius Secondary School
 Chalo Trust School
 Chengelo Secondary School
 Chizongwe Secondary School
 David Kaunda Technical High School
 Hillcrest Technical Secondary School
 International School of Lusaka
 Kamwala Secondary School
 Kansenshi Secondary School
 Kitwe Boys Secondary School
 Linda Secondary School
 Luanshya Boys Secondary School
 Munali Secondary School
 Ndola Girls Technical High School

Colleges

 Charles Lwanga College of Education
 Evelyn Hone College
 Kasama College of Education
 Zambia Forestry College
 Zambia Open University

International schools

 American International School of Lusaka
 Baobab College
 Banani International Secondary School
 French School of Lusaka

See also

 Education in Zambia
 List of universities in Zambia
 Lists of schools

References

External links
 Zambia School Directory (2128 schools listed)

Schools
Schools
Zambia
Zambia

Schools